The 2021 Hankook 12 Hours of Mugello was the 7th running of the 12 Hours of Mugello. It was also the second round of the 2021 24H GT and TCE Series. The race was won by Daniel Allemann, Ralf Bohn, Alfred Renauer and Robert Renauer in the #91 Herberth Motorsport Porsche 911 GT3 R.

Schedule

Entry list
42 cars were entered into the event; 29 GT cars and 13 TCEs.

Results

Qualifying

TCE
Fastest in class in bold.

GT
Fastest in class in bold.

Race

Part 1
Class winner in bold.

Part 2
Class winner in bold.

Footnotes

References

External links

12 Hours of Mugello
12 Hours of Mugello
2021 in 24H Series